The 1878 Princeton Tigers football team represented the College of New Jersey, then more commonly known as Princeton College, in the 1878 college football season. The team finished with a 6–0 record and allowed only one goal. The Tigers were retroactively named national champions by the Billingsley Report, National Championship Foundation, and Parke H. Davis. This season marked Princeton's eighth national championship, and one of 11 in a 13-year period between 1869 and 1881. The team's captain was Bland Ballard.

Schedule

References

Princeton
Princeton Tigers football seasons
College football national champions
College football undefeated seasons
Princeton Tigers football